Miss Grand International 2022 was the 10th-anniversary edition of the Miss Grand International pageant,  held on 25 October 2022 at Sentul International Convention Center in Bogor Regency of West Java province, Indonesia. The pageant featured contestants from sixty-eight countries and territories, of which, the Brazilian representative, Isabella Menin, was named the winner and crowned by Miss Grand International 2021 Nguyễn Thúc Thùy Tiên of Vietnam.

The pageant's grand final round was hosted by Thai television personality Matthew Deane, and highlighted by the live performance of an Indonesian singer, Rossa. However, the program was not broadcast on any national television stations since of indigenous religious tenets, the entire series of activities was instead streamed on the organizer's own YouTube channel, GrandTV, as in past editions.

In addition to crowning the traditional five finalists, the remaining top ten finalists were enthroned as the fifth runner-up on the occasion of celebrating the first decade anniversary.

Moreover, the "Golden Grand Award" and its secondary position "Silver Grand Award", was also introduced in this edition, in which three of Miss Grand's national directors with the preeminent managerial implementation, Phạm Kim Dung of Vietnam, Eriko Inoda of Japan, and Vicente Gonzalez of Spain, were awarded.

Background

Date and venue

On the final coronation night of Miss Grand International 2021 in Thailand, the host of the event additionally announced that the 10th anniversary edition of the pageant will happen in Indonesia on 25 October, with the pre-pageant activities in the tourist destination island Bali, and the final coronation night in the capital city Jakarta. Additionally, through generating additional employment in the community, the contest's implementation is anticipated to support the Indonesian local economy's recovery from the proceeding COVID-19 pandemic.

Furthermore, the SICC also served as the location for the other two main sub-contests including the national costume parade and the preliminary competition. The organization later disclosed that Le Méridien Jakarta and Seminyak Beach Resort & Spa will have functioned as accommodation for the delegates during the pageant activities in Jakarta and Bali, respectively.

Sponsorship
The following is the list of the main sponsorship for the Miss Grand International 2022 pageant.

 Ministry of Tourism and Creative Economy of Indonesia
 MS Glow Cosmetics – Indonesian beauty brand under the auspices of PT. Kosmetika Cantik Indonesia.
 JNE Express – Indonesian express delivery and logistics courier.
 VIBE – Indonesian liqueurs and spirits brand founded in 2002.
 City Vision Indonesia - Indonesian Out-of-Home media provider company.
 YT Gold – Indonesian gold and jewelry manufacturer.
 Devya Clinic – Indonesian aesthetic dental & implant center based in Jakarta.
 Herwell – Indonesian cosmetics and diet supplement brand.
 Sroja – Indonesian scarf, shawl, and hijab brand.
 iCantix&co – Indonesian beauty products retail store

Selection of participants

Overview

As per the data collected in the national preliminary pageants' table below,  37 out of 68 confirmed candidates were determined through the national pageants, 21 of which were the Miss Grand national contest winners (A1) while the rest were either main winners (A2) or the supplementary titleholders (B1) of other pageants such as the candidates from Canada, Czech Republic, Kyrgyzstan (did not compete due to the impact of the ongoing Russo-Ukrainian War), and the original candidate from Panama who was later replaced by an appointed candidate after a license transfer. The remaining delegates were either promoted to the position without organizing the respective national contest (B2 and C2) e.g. the representative of Dominican Republic, Guatemala, Indonesia, Mauritius, Peru, and Venezuela, or elected through the private casting (C1) such as the Mexican's representative.

Of the appointed candidates, the representative of Myanmar, Kansuda Chanakeeree, was elected by the national director Htoo Ant Lwin after participating in Miss Grand Thailand 2022 where she was placed among the top 20 finalists. Kansuda is half Thai-Myanmar with Karen descent. Previously, she had participated in the Miss Universe Thailand 2019 and 2021 pageants, in which she qualified for the finals of 20 and 15, respectively. 

Seven candidates were assigned as the replacements for the original ones, including:
 Camila Sanabria of Bolivia, who had been elected Miss Supranational Bolivia 2023 in the  pageant, was appointed Miss Grand Bolivia 2022 as a consequence of the Alondra Mercado's renouncement; Mercado was previously announced Miss Grand Bolivia 2022 on the stage of the Miss Bolivia 2022 pageant.
 Lisseth Naranjo of Ecuador, a former Miss Grand Ecuador who resigned from the title before competing at the international pageant in 2020, Naranjo was designated as the replacement for Emilia Vásquez, the first runner-up Miss Grand Ecuador 2021 who was appointed the country representative for Miss Grand International 2022, but resigned before competing at such with undisclosed reasons.
 Laura de Sanctis,  a former Miss Universe Panamá, was designated Miss Grand Panamá 2022 by a new Miss Grand Panama licensee, Chass Panamá, a multi-brand jewelry shop based in San Miguelito who took over the franchise from Señorita Panamá in mid-2022. Originally, Katheryn Yejas, one of the finalists of Señorita Panamá 2022 was named Miss Grand Panamá 2022 but was later ostracized due to the licensee differentiation.
 Luiseth Materán, a former Miss Universe Venezuela, was appointed to the position after the original representative, Sabrina Deraneck, had resigned from the title within a month after being crowned. Previously, Deraneck was designated as the country representative for Miss Grand International 2022 at the final coronational night of Miss Grand Venezuela 2023 on 13 August.
 Laysha Salazar of México: an internal conflict in the licensee team between Orlando Ruiz, a founder of the Concurso Nacional de Belleza México (CNB México) who also served as the general director of Miss Grand México, and Flavio Falsiroli, Miss Grand México national director, caused Orlando Ruiz to depart from the team and his affiliated candidate, Jessica Farjat, who was previously set to represent the country at Miss Grand International 2022, also resigned from the title. Laysha Salazar was then elected as the replacement.
 Chiara Vanderveeren of Belgium, was appointed as the replacement for the Miss Grand Belgium 2022 contest winner, Alyssa Gilliaert, who resigned from the title due to medical conditions. Chiara was a contestant in the 2022 Miss Grand Belgium pageant.
 Fabien Laurencio of Cuba, who previously obtained the first runner-up at the continental pageant Nuestra Belleza Latina 2021, was appointed Miss Grand Cuba 2022, as the replacement for Daniela Espinosa who renounced the title for undisclosed reasons.

In this 2022 edition, three countries were expected to make their debuts, but two withdrew for unspecified reasons even though their representatives had already been determined; six countries that competed in the 2021 edition withdrew due to a lack of a national licensee, and 15 countries returned to the competition after being absent in the previous editions. Initially, seventy-two countries and territories franchises confirmed that they would send their candidates to Indonesia; however, representatives from the Democratic Republic of the Congo, Kazakhstan, and Kyrgyzstan, withdrew before the pageant started, while the representative from Kosovo withdrew due to health problems at the fourth day of the pre-final activities, making the finalized total of sixty-eight contestants.

The information is summarized below.

National preliminary pageants
Thirty-nine countries organized national preliminary pageants (A1 - B2) to select their representatives for Miss Grand International 2022, the competition details are shown in the table below; 23 of which were the Miss Grand national contest (A1), however, 3 of these 39 candidates, the original Belgium, Cuba, and Panamanian representatives who were chosen through the respective national pageants, were later replaced by the other appointed candidates, as mentioned above; and the Kyrgyzstan representative withdrew before entering the international contest due to the increase in flight ticket prices during the 2022 Russo-Ukrainian war.

Results summary

Final placements

Special awards

Pageant

Ancillary events

Pre-arrival voting
As previously done since 2018, pre-arrival voting on the organizer's Facebook and Instagram pages was launched a week before the advent of the candidates. Ten contestants with the most scores calculated by the number of likes and shares on their portrait photos acquired the authority to be present at the exclusive dinner with the pageant president, Nawat Itsaragrisil, which happened after the welcome ceremony at the Seminyak Beach Resort & Spa on October 5. According to the results of the previous editions, the winners of the pre-arrival vote usually qualified for the quarterfinalists (Top 20).

Note:  Points in millions.

Country's Power of the Year challenge
The "Country's Power of the Year" award returned after being introduced for the first time in 2020, with fans able to vote for delegates to advance to the quarterfinals (Top 20) through Instagram, reducing the actual number of the top 20 qualifiers directly chosen by the organizer to 19. All candidates were divided into 10 groups for the challenge, with 9 groups of 7 and 1 group of 6. The voting took place on the pageant organizer's Instagram account, where the photos to vote for was presented for 1 group per day from October 7 at 08:00 PM to 06:00 PM the next day. The winner of each group advanced to the second round where all 10 qualified countries were randomly grouped into 2 groups of 5. The organizer then ran the 24 hours of voting again to elect 2 winners of each group to compete against each other in the group, each group winner advanced to the final round to determine the overall winner. The winner of the "Country's Power of the Year" challenge will be automatically qualified as one of the top 20 finalists of the competition.

The voting result is shown in the chart below.

|-
|style="text-align: left;"|Source:

Balinese costume presentation 

The traditional Balinese costume parade was co-organized by the MGI PLC and a theatrical Balinese art performance team, Bali Agung, to be the highlight event of the Bali Agung Grand Show, which happened on October 11 at Bali Theatre, located in Gianyar's Bali Safari and Marine Park, The purpose of the collaboration is to re-promote Indonesian tourism to the world scene after being hit by the COVID-19 pandemic. Each participant donned and paraded in different traditional Balinese attires created by Indonesian designers, Ni Ketut Arik Wijayanti and Inggi Indrayana Kendran.

The event was hosted by Miss Grand International 2014, Daryanne Lees, and was streamed live to the audience worldwide on the pageant's YouTube channel, GrandTV. All the event-related revenues, with no deductions, was donated to the Bali Safari to revitalize the theater after it had been shuttered for over three years due to the COVID-19 outbreak.

Sportswear and swimsuit competition

Since Indonesia is a Muslim country, appearing in a swimsuit—either a one-piece model or a bikini—in public violates religious tenets requiring women to dress modestly, and Indonesian cultural agencies often strictly control elements that are considered revealing and objectionable. Although the swimsuit contest has been regarded as one of the most significant events and also used to elect the Best in Swimsuit winner for the Miss Grand International pageant since its inception in 2013, as usually implemented in most international beauty competitions, but due to the aforementioned religious precept, the swimsuit event was downsized to a private event – no physical audience allowed but still be broadcast to an audience worldwide except for the host nation, Indonesia – and will submissively be replaced by the sportswear round on the preliminary and final stages of Miss Grand International 2022, the first time the swimsuit competition was abolished on the stage of the Miss Grand International.

The sportswear competition was added as an ad hoc event in the Miss Grand International 2022 tournament and took place on October 9 at Bebek Tepi Sawah Restaurant and Villas in Ubud town of Bali province, in which 68 aspirants wore sportswear designed by Indonesian designers, Didiet Maulana and the Iwan Tirta Batik team, and then paraded one by one in front of the panel of judges, the Kosovo representative was absent due to health conditions. Meanwhile, the swimsuit private show was held later on October 12 at the Seminyak Beach Resort & Spa, where an Indonesian swimwear label called "Niconico" was used as the replacement for the MGI-designed swimsuit, which was previously utilized in its prior editions.

 Sportswear contest's selection committee
  – Miss Grand Indonesia national director
 Didiet Maulana – Creative director and fashion designer
 Happy Salma – Actress and theater producer
 Nguyễn Thúc Thùy Tiên – Miss Grand International 2021
 Teresa Chaivisut – Vice President of Miss Grand International Organization
 Nawat Itsaragrisil – President of Miss Grand International Organization

 Swimsuit contest's selection committee
 Ivan Gunawan – Founder of 
 Nguyễn Thúc Thùy Tiên – Miss Grand International 2021
 Teresa Chaivisut – Vice President of Miss Grand International Organization
 Nawat Itsaragrisil – President of Miss Grand International Organization

For the "Best in Swimsuit" award, the first 10 qualified candidates were determined by the public vote on the pageant's Facebook page and the other 10 finalists by the panel of judges, and then the number of each group was minimized to 5 with the same procedure. The final winner expected to be announced at the pageant grand final was not elected and no official statement from the organizer for this award. The other qualified candidates are shown on the chart below.

|-
|style="text-align: left;"|Source:

National costume contest

The Miss Grand International 2022 national costume contest took place on October 20 at the Sentul International Convention Center in Bogor. Each contestant walked down the runway one at a time, dressed in a garment to reflect the nation's history and culture, with two winners being proclaimed at the grand coronation round on October 25, one selected by public vote on the pageant's social media, including Facebook and Instagram, and another to be directly determined by the panel of judges. The event was live transmitted to the audience worldwide on the pageant's YouTube channel, GrandTV, hosted by Miss Grand International 2014, Daryanne Lees, and featured live performances by two Indonesian singers, Titi DJ and Krisdayanti, marking the first time the artists' live performances were highlighted in this sub-contest.

 National costume contest's selection committee
Janelee Chaparro – Miss Grand International 2013 from Puerto Rico
Ariska Putri Pertiwi – Miss Grand International 2016 from Indonesia
Clara Sosa – Miss Grand International 2018 from Paraguay
Valentina Figuera – Miss Grand International 2019 from Venezuela 
Abena Appiah – Miss Grand International 2020 from United States 
Nguyễn Thúc Thùy Tiên – Miss Grand International 2021 from Vietnam
 Ivan Gunawan – Founder of 
 Teresa Chaivisut – Vice president of Miss Grand International Organization
 Nawat Itsaragrisil – President of Miss Grand International Organization

The selection result is shown in the chart below.

|-
|style="text-align: left;"|Source:

Preliminary night
The Miss Grand International 2022 preliminary show, which is composed of the evening gown and the sportswear round, took place on October 20, at the Sentul International Convention Center.  In such an event, each participant paraded on stage in each round, one by one, wearing the sportswear designed by Indonesian batik fashion designers, Ivan Gunawan and Iwan Tirta Batik, in the first round, and then the evening gown created by the contestant's designer, in the following round. The scores from this night's event, together with all previous scores accumulated since the first day after obtaining the national title, determine the top 20 finalists who will be revealed during the grand final telecast on October 25.

The event was live transmitted on the pageant's YouTube channel, GrandTV, hosted by Miss Grand International 2014, Daryanne Lees. The Indonesian music band , as well as a solo singer,  were the event's live performers.

Preliminary round selection committee
  – Indonesian actor
 Syarifah Rahma – Indonesian economic and business anchor
 Devya Lina – Indonesian dentist
 Dessy Ruhati – Director of National and International Events, Minister of Tourism and Creative Economy of Indonesia
Janelee Chaparro – Miss Grand International 2013 from Puerto Rico
Nguyễn Thúc Thùy Tiên – Miss Grand International 2021 from Vietnam
  – Founder of 
 Teresa Chaivisut – Vice president of Miss Grand International Organization
 Nawat Itsaragrisil – President of Miss Grand International Organization

Grand coronation

The Miss Grand International 2022 grand final was held on October 25 at Sentul International Convention Center in Bogor, West Java province, hosted by a Thai television personality Matthew Deane, and featured live performances by an Indonesian singer Rossa, making the first time after an eight-year absence that the competition was highlighted by a special guest live performance, since 2013, by a Thai American hip hop trio Thaitanium. In the event, the initial semifinalists (Top 20), selected by the organizer personnel based on all pageant activities as well as the aspirant domestic affairs prior to entering the international pageant camp, were disclosed.

All final competition selection formats are shown in the chart beside; the "Country of the Year" award, determined by public-free voting on the organizer's Instagram account, was reinstated after being introduced in 2020; the winner of this automatically qualified for the top 20 finalists regardless of all accumulation scores, reducing the actual number of the top 20 qualifiers directly chosen by the organizer to 19. As did the winner of the "Miss Popular vote," determined by public-paid voting on the official pageant website; was also automatically placed among the top 10 finalists.

The result of the Miss Popular vote is shown below, the final result was collected on October 25 after the top 20 finalists' announcement of the grand final round, in which "Yuvna Rinishta" of Mauritius was named the Miss Popular Vote winner.

Post-pageant

Vietnamese unsatisfactoriness

The tension between pageant fans, particularly Thais and Vietnamese, began when Thai and Vietnamese representatives encountered each other in the final round of 24-hour voting for the fast-track award "Country's Power of the Year," in which the scores were calculated based on the number of likes on the candidates' portrait photos on the pageant's Instagram. The vote was supposed to end with Thailand winning with a slight lead over Vietnam. Still, the pageant organizer instead prolonged the voting session by 12 hours, stating that the number of votes was equal and that a certain number of voters did not follow the contest's page, which would not count as a point. However, the public specified that such a strategy was employed only to increase the number of followers on the page, and that extension turned Vietnam back on the winning side.

Tensions between the two countries escalated when their delegates met again in the final 24-hour voting round of the "Best National Costume," which was also determined by the number of votes and shares cast on the pageant's Instagram and Facebook pages. However, a modification in vote-counting rules that included only votes from new followers resulted in Thailand's representative leading in calculated points, although the Vietnamese representative had more likes and shares, creating significant displeasure with the rules, particularly among the Vietnamese fan group, some believed that the organizer intended to hand the victory to the Thai delegate. To avoid a squabble, the organizer then decided to give the award to both countries in the contest's grand final.

Tensions reached a critical threshold in the final contest on October 25, when Miss Vietnam failed to qualify for the top 10, while Miss Thailand finished in second place, causing a wave of dissatisfaction with the results of the Vietnamese fan club and urging for the reason of their representative's being unqualified for such a spot, criticizing for an English ability of Thai representative, as well as the launch of the campaign to unfollow the contest's social media pages. As a result, Miss Grand International's Instagram followers plummeted from 6.5 million to 4.2 million within only 24 hours. Furthermore, the pageant president's subsequent interview about the reasons for not selecting the Vietnamese delegate to the top 10 is due to her disproportionate body shape, her upper body being too long compared to her lower body and her hips being too large, causing such resentment to be more aggressive. Many Vietnamese netizens, including some television personalities such as Ngọc Hân, Nguyễn Minh Tú, and Vũ Hà Anh, were exasperated with the aforementioned disparaging statements and demanded an apology for Miss Vietnam. Some have called for Vietnam to cancel hosting the 2023 tournament and boycott the contest. 

However, Miss Vietnam refused to speak out about the issue. She was previously criticized by Vietnamese netizens for being over-weight before entering Miss Grand Vietnam 2022 pageant, as well as her makeup, hairstyle, and fashion style during the pageant camp of the international contest in Indonesia.

Delegitimisation of Miss Mauritius

On October 28, three days after the coronation night, the pageant organizer released an official statement on their Facebook page dethroning Miss Grand Mauritius, Yuvna Rinishta, who had previously won the Miss Popular Vote then was automatically placed among the top 10 finalists and was also required to sign a contract to work with the organization until January 2023. According to the aforementioned announcement, Miss Mauritius decided to resign from the title due to her inability to sign the contract and complete the duty as the 5th runner-up, therefore she could no longer use the title with immediate effect. However, the Miss Grand Mauritius organizer, Ahmad Abbas, thereupon publicized an argument on the national pageant's social media claiming that the content previously published by the Miss Grand International organization caused a misunderstanding, despite the fact that Miss Yuvna had already received a resignation document but did not sign it and disagreed with the content mentioned in the document. The reason given for the incident is that the vision of the international organization does not correspond to that of the Miss Grand Mauritius pageant. Abbas also requested the international organizer stop publishing such a misleading statement.

According to the Miss Grand International chairperson's statement, which was published by several Thai online newspapers, including Daily News and Siam Rath, cited that the Mauritian national director, who lived with Miss Mauritius in Thailand and Indonesia for three months of training prior to entering the international contest, requested to closely monitor the country's representative during the entire pageant duty period after she had been elected the 5th runner-up, but the international firm refused. A problem-solving negotiation occurred, but no mutual agreements were achieved. The national director also refused to allow Miss Mauritius to sign a contract with Miss Grand International and asked that she returns to the country, causing the international organizer to demand Miss Mauritius resign, and later assigned the Philippines representative, Roberta Tamondong, as the replacement.

Pageant campaign-related activities
The following list is a summary of Miss Grand International's charitable activities during Isabella Menin's reign.

Controversies

Russian and Ukrainian representatives issue
On October 3, the pageant organizer revealed all the roommate pairing lists of Miss Grand International 2022 candidates in a live video streamed on the pageant's official Facebook page, in which the Russian and Ukrainian candidates were paired as roommates amid the ongoing war between the two countries. The issue has sparked an overwrought discussion on many social media sites because of the tense political situation between the two countries over the past few months, Some accused the organizer of attempting to profit from the conflict by pairing the two contestants on purpose to make the contest viral and demanded the organizer adjust the room sharing situation, while others advised thinking optimistically and that the beauty competition had nothing to do with the war.

However, even though the representative from Russia, Ekaterina Astashenkova, has stated through social media that there is no problem staying together with the Ukrainian representatives during the contest, the Ukrainian representative, Olga Vasyliv, denied doing so and also called for removing Russia from the competition, a part of her statement is shown below.

The public debate on social media and the call from the Ukrainian representative caused the organizers to change roommates for both of them after the two contestants had arrived in Bali, to prevent any further issues.

Withdrawal of Kosovo
After the sash reception and welcome ceremony of the Miss Grand International 2022 pageant in Bali, the representative of Kosovo, Edona Aliu, who currently works as a model in Zurich and had previously obtained the Miss Grand national title at the Miss Universe Albania and Kosovo 2022 pageant in June, was absent from various pageant activities, including the rehearsals, sportswear competition, Balinese costume parade, as well as the swimsuit contest, but the organizers did not make an official announcement for such an incident, sparking a lot of debate on various digital platforms. The Paraguayan online newspaper, La Nación, as well as the Mexican website, Glam Star, published the media released by a Venezuelan "Jesús Hernández", who claimed the reasons for such an incident were either the winner of the contest was already elected within the first few days of the activities, or she is anti-animal cruelty and brings animals to detention, and the pageant activity that takes the candidates to the Bali Safari upsets her and causes her to withdraw, or she is tired and prefers to enjoy the vacation in Bali instead. Many Vietnamese media outlets have also reported this.

However, the pageant organizer later issued a clarification statement on October 11, citing that her health issues precluded her from participating in pageant-related events and that she withdrew from the competition three days earlier following medical advice with the organizer's approval. Meanwhile, Edona has not spoken out about the withdrawal.

Contestants

References

External links 

 
 

Miss Grand International
October 2022 events in Indonesia
Grand International